Manzar Iqbal (born 21 December 1958) is an American field hockey player. He competed for the United States at the 1984 Summer Olympics in Los Angeles.

References

External links

1958 births
Living people
American male field hockey players
Olympic field hockey players of the United States
Field hockey players at the 1984 Summer Olympics
Pakistani emigrants to the United States
Field hockey players from Lahore